Ernest Walter Histed (1862–1947) was an English-American photographer born in Brighton.

He went to United States and created a successful business in Chicago, and then in Pittsburgh. He returned to England to set up a studio first in New Bond Street and then in Baker Street, London. In 1898 he made portraits of H. Rider Haggard, Clara Butt and the Empress of Germany, the last by command of Queen Victoria at Windsor Castle. He also photographed Royal Academicians, leading actors for The Candid Friend and Pope Pius X. Then he returned to New York, and operated a studio on Fifth Avenue. He moved to Palm Beach, Florida and continued to work until 1934. The largest collection of his work is held by the Museum of the City of New York.

References

External links 

1862 births
1947 deaths
Photographers from London
People from Brighton
British expatriates in the United States
Photographers from New York City
Photographers from Illinois
20th-century American photographers